Saš is a village in the municipality of Tutin, Serbia. According to the 2002 census, the village has a population of 42 people.

References

Populated places in Raška District